Đoan Nam Vương Trịnh Khải (chữ Hán: 鄭楷, 10 October 1763 – 23 July 1786) was one of the Trịnh lords in northern Vietnam. He fought against the armies of the infant Trịnh Cán to win leadership of the northern warlords (reigning 29 November 1782 – July 1786), but was himself defeated by the Tây Sơn rebel leader, later emperor Nguyễn Huệ. Trịnh Khải later committed suicide while were arrested by the Tây Sơn troops. He was succeeded by the last of the lords, Trịnh Bồng.

References

1763 births
1786 deaths
Trịnh lords